Romario Baggio Rakotoarisoa (born 24 January 1996) is a Malagasy international footballer who plays for Fosa Juniors, as a striker.

Career
Born in Antananarivo, he has played club football for Fosa Juniors.

He made his international debut for Madagascar in 2017.

References

1996 births
Living people
Malagasy footballers
Madagascar international footballers
Fosa Juniors FC players
People from Antananarivo
Association football forwards
2019 Africa Cup of Nations players